The Usangu lampeye (Lacustricola usanguensis) is a species of poeciliid fish endemic to Tanzania. It occurs in the upper Little Ruaha River drainage. Its natural habitats are swamps, pools, and small streams. This species grows to a length of  TL. It is also found in the aquarium trade.

References 

Usangu lampeye
Endemic freshwater fish of Tanzania
Usangu lampeye
Taxonomy articles created by Polbot
Taxobox binomials not recognized by IUCN